Helders is a surname. Notable people with the surname include:

Gerard Helders (1905–2013), Dutch politician
Matt Helders (born 1986), British drummer, vocalist and songwriter